Carl Johan Rheborg (born 5 June 1963) is a Swedish comedian, actor and script writer. He is a member of the Swedish comedy group Killinggänget.

Rheborg is probably most known for his role as the space hero Kenny Starfighter, the irresponsible Percy Nilegård, and also as the talking stain in Tide's Super Bowl commercial. In 2015 he played Ove in the stage version of the book A Man Called Ove.

Selected filmography
1992: I manegen med Glenn Killing (In The Ring With Glenn Killing)
1995: NileCity 105,6
1995: Bert – Den siste oskulden (Bert – The Last Virgin)
1996: Percy tårar (Percy's Tears)
1997: Kenny Starfighter
1998: Rederiet (High Seas)
1999: Torsk på Tallinn
2000: En häxa i familjen (A Witch In The Family)
2001: Känd från TV (Known From TV)
2002: Cleo 
2004: Four Shades of Brown (Swedish title: Fyra nyanser av brunt)
2005: Two Into One (Swedish title: Hotelliggaren)
2007: Hjälp!
2009: Kenny Begins
 2010–2019: Solsidan
 2020–: Agatha Christies Sven Hjerson

References

External links
Rheborg's official site (Swedish)
Rheborg at New York Times movies

1963 births
Living people
Swedish male actors
Swedish comedians
Swedish screenwriters
Swedish male screenwriters